Apak is a Turkish masculine given name and surname. Notable people with the name include:

 Eşref Apak (born 1982), Turkish hammer thrower
 Sema Apak (born 1985), Turkish sprinter

Turkish masculine given names
Turkish-language surnames